Babylon by Bus is a 2006 book by two friends, Ray Lemoine and Jeff Neumann, who gave up their valuable franchise selling "Yankees Suck" T-Shirts at Fenway Park to find meaning and adventure in Iraq, where they became employed by the occupation in jobs for which they lacked qualification and witnessed much that amazed and disturbed them.

The book is written from Lemoine's point of view.

Summary 
The book starts out with Lemoine and Neumann at Yankee Stadium, a baseball stadium in Bronx, New York. A turn of events in the Boston Red Sox vs. New York Yankees game leaves them feeling down, and the two find themselves wanting to travel to somewhere they have never been before.

The book is then set in Post-War Iraq, which is occupied by the American military, and the CPA.

2006 non-fiction books
British travel books
Books about Iraq
English non-fiction books
American travel books
Penguin Press books